Bourbon Township is one of ten townships in Marshall County, Indiana, USA.  As of the 2010 census, its population was 3,152 and it contained 1,232 housing units.

History
Bourbon Township was organized January 6, 1840.  It was most likely named for Bourbon County, Kentucky, from where most of the early settlers emigrated.  The town of Bourbon, Indiana received its name for the same reason.

Geography

Cities, towns, villages
 Bourbon

Cemeteries
The township contains five cemeteries: Ganshorn, Parks Memorial, Sandridge aka Foster Chapel, Mt. Pleasant, and Pleasant Hill.

Major highways

Education
 Triton School Corporation

Bourbon Township residents may obtain a free library card from the Bourbon Public Library in Bourbon.

Political districts
 Indiana's 2nd congressional district
 State House District 23
 State Senate District 9

References
 
 United States Census Bureau 2008 TIGER/Line Shapefiles
 IndianaMap

External links
 Indiana Township Association
 United Township Association of Indiana
 City-Data.com page for Bourbon Township

Townships in Marshall County, Indiana
Townships in Indiana